Mustafakemalpaşa is a town and district in Bursa Province, in the Marmara region of Turkey.

The Mustafakemalpaşa River (Mustafakemalpaşa Çayı) flows through it.

History
The ancient Greek name of the county was Kremaste (Κρεμαστή in Ancient Greek, Kırmasti in modern Turkish), under the Kingdom of Bithynia. Around 300AD, the town became important when it became a Christian diocese. In 1336, the town was incorporated into the Ottoman Empire by Orhan. From 1867 until 1922, Kırmasti was part of Hüdavendigâr vilayet. The town was devastated in 1920 during the Greco-Turkish war. After the War of Independence, led by Mustafa Kemal Atatürk, the town council decided to rename the city Mustafakemalpaşa in his honor. The town currently has 56,727 residents.

Sister towns
  Sciacca
  Lipkovo
  Mostar
  Kamenicë
  Copceac

References

 
Cities in Turkey
Populated places in Bursa Province
Districts of Bursa Province
Things named after Mustafa Kemal Atatürk